María Teresa Uribe de Hincapié (9 February 1940 – 1 January 2019)  was a Colombian sociologist, specialising in research into conflict and violence.

Early life and education 
Born in Pereira, Risaralda, in 1940, Uribe grew up during the period of Colombian civil war known as La Violencia. Injured and wounded travellers, displaced from their rural homes, came to her family home in the 1950s seeking medical treatment from her father, a doctor, and Uribe helped him to care for them. She later stated that this early experience of the result of conflict inspired her academic research interests. 

Uribe studied sociology at the Universidad Pontificia Bolivariana in Medellín and later completed a master's degree in urban planning at the National University of Colombia there.

Career 
In 1973, following her graduation, she took a position as a lecturer at the University of Antioquia. There, she met Carlos Gaviria Díaz; he introduced her to the newly emerging field of political science, which began to influence her sociological work. From 1991, Uribe worked on her research projects in the university's Institute of Political Studies.

Uribe retired from the university in 2005; in 2007 she was invited to participate in the country's first Historical Memory project, however, she was only able to be involved for six months due to poor health.

Uribe was invited to contribute to a number of national and local political conversations during her career, such as roundtable negotiations with the 19 April guerilla movement, and talks with Medellín militia, aimed at de-mobilising paramilitaries.

Awards and honors 
In 1999, Uribe received the University of Antioquia's Research Award, and in 2004 the Francisco Antonio Zea University Merit. In 2015 she was awarded an honorary doctorate by the University of Antioquia.

Personal life 
Uribe's husband, Guillermo Hincapié Orozco, was a mayor of Medellín. He pre-deceased her by six days. Uribe died on 1 January 2019 at a health care center in Medellín.

Publications 

Poderes y regiones : problemas en la constitución de la Nación Colombiana, 1810–1850 (Powers and regions: problems in the constitution of Colombia, 1810–1850) University of Antioquia; Medellín; 1987
La territorialidad de los conflictos y de la violencia en Antioquia (The territoriality of conflicts and violence in Antioquia) University of Antioquia; Medellín; 1990
Uraba: region o territorio : un analisis en el contexto de la politica, la historia y la etnicidad (Region or Territory: an analysis in the context of politics, history and ethnicity) University of Antioquia; Medellín; 1992
Nación, ciudadano y soberano (Nationhood, citizenship and sovereignty) Corporation Region; Medellín; 2001

References

1940 births
2019 deaths
National University of Colombia alumni
Academic staff of the University of Antioquia
Colombian sociologists
Colombian women sociologists
People from Pereira, Colombia
20th-century social scientists
21st-century social scientists
20th-century women scientists
21st-century women scientists
20th-century Colombian women
21st-century Colombian women